Choi Soon-Young was a memorable figure for Koreans who remembered the 1980s and 1990s. He is a chairman of Shindonga group

He led the group with 22 affiliates and built 63 Building, a Korean landmark, in 1985.  However, Shindonga Group was disbanded in 1997 due to the Korean financial crisis.

He also served as president of the Korea football Association and founded the Hallelujah football club.  The Hallelujah football club became the original K League football club and the original championship team, but after the end of the 1985 season, "Halleluhah football club will concentrate on the missionary work, which is the original purpose of the Hallelujah football Team," he said, and was converted into an amateur club, which was disbanded in 1998.

Tax evasion 
With the disbandment of Shindonga Group, Choi Soon-young was questioned by prosecutors on charges of smuggling foreign currency worth 200 billion won.

The court ruled in 2006 that he should be sentenced to five years in prison and fined 157.4 billion won.

However, two years later, he was granted a special pardon after the inauguration of the Lee Myung Bak government, and since then, he has not paid a single additional fine.

Choi Soon-young was also ranked third in the cumulative ranking of delinquent taxes announced by the National Tax Service at the end of 2020.

Hallelujah football club 

The Hallelujah football club was the first Christian missionary football team in South Korea.

The original members of Lee Young-moo, Shin Hyun-ho, Park Sung-hwa, and Hong Sung-ho were the representative soccer players of Korea, who were the players of the Hallelujah soccer team.

The mascot was an eagle, and the first-year K-League champion.

However, it was disbanded by the IMF in 1998. However, the Hallelujah football club was re-established in 1999, and changed its name to Goyang Zaicro FC in 2012.

In 2013, he participated in the K-League Challenge, the second division of the K-League.However, Goyang Zaicro FC also withdrew from the K-League Challenge at the end of the 2016 season.

Current 
The reason why Choi Soon-young does not pay the additional fines and taxes is said to be "no money" in his words.

But his life is like a "king." His life was first revealed in 2013 with a visit by the Seoul Metropolitan Government's delinquent tax collection team.

Nevertheless, he had a luxury car, a driver, and a luxury villa of 100 pyeong.

Nevertheless, the Seoul Metropolitan Government's delinquent tax collection team seized only 130 million won worth of land from him.

Torch Foundation 
The reason why the Seoul Metropolitan Government cannot seize money from him is because of the existence of the Torch Foundation. The Torch Foundation is a "Christian Missionary Group". The chairman of this group is his wife. He founded the Torch Foundation in 1988 when he was chairman of Shindonga Group. "I live with the help of the church," he said. His wife also receives a salary of 15 million won from the Torch Foundation.

Property of the Torch Foundation 
A SBS coverage team released a list of the torch foundation's assets, with the torch foundation's mission center alone valued at more than 70 billion won. It is said that the land is 38.4 billion won and the building is 35.1 billion won. In addition, the Torch Foundation leased the mission center to Onnuri Church, a large church in Korea. The minimum rental amount is known to be more than 70 billion won.

In addition, there are a total of three villas where Choi Soon-young's family live, which are known to be owned by the Torch Foundation. The three villas are known to be worth more than 10 billion won in total. In addition, the cost of land such as Anseong, Sokcho, and Yongin is known to be about 19.3 billion won.

KAICAM 
The Torch Foundation is not the only organization he founded. In 1972, 17 years before the Torch Foundation was founded, he founded his first Christian organization. It is a Korean Christian missionary. He was the founding chairman of the Korean Christian Mission. Later, in 1996, the position of chairman was transferred to his wife, Lee Hyung-ja. After that, it was renamed "KAICAM" in June 2003. The official name is the Korean Association of Independent Churches And Missions. In short, "KAICAM" advocates a united community created by pastors and missionary group leaders who want to be free from the politics of denominations and denominations. In 2020, there are 2,730 full-time pastors, an influential organization in Christianity. His wife served as chairman of the board of directors of the organization until 2011, and has remained as a director until now, except for about four years later.

If his wife did not take over as a director, an acquaintance of Choi Soon-young took over as a director. Representatively, Choi Soon-young's church acquaintance, the chairman of the Torch Foundation, and the secretary-general of the Torch Foundation were the directors. This group is heavily linked to the Torch Foundation.

The Torch Foundation's control of KAICAM 
The court judged that the Torch Foundation dominated KAICAM. In 2017, the Suwon court ruled against it, and Ham, who participated in the ruling, once said, "The Torch Foundation has the right to appoint KAICAM, and KAICAM belongs to the Torch Foundation." In addition, it was revealed that the person in charge of accounting in KAICAM received accounting training from the Torch Foundation, and that the person in charge of financial audit in KAICAM served as the director of the Torch Foundation's accounting bureau.

There is also a content that KAICAM delivered tens of millions of won to the Torch Foundation. KAICAM delivered 50 million won (or 100 million won) in 2016 to the Torch Korean National Diaspora World Mission Competition, the largest event held by the Torch Foundation, the Suwon Court's ruling states.

Profile 

 Educational background

 Kyunggi High school
 Sungkyunkwan University BA of commerce
 Southwestern Universtity honorary doctorate
 Sungkyunkwan University honorary doctorate

 Career

 1976 ~ 1999 Chairman of Shindonga Group
 1979 ~ 1986 President of the Korea football Association
 1979 ~ Foundation of the Korean Christian Missionary Church (currently Torch Foundation)
 1980 Far East Broadcasting Company chairman of the board
 1983 Hoseo University chairman of the board
 1984 Taking over the Eternal Academy and changing it to Shindonga Academy
 1985 ~ 1988 Jeonju University chairman of the board
 1986 Asia football Confederation Vice chairman
 1996 Member of 2002 World Cup Organizing Committee 
 Awarded

Imprisonment 
 February 1999 - Arrested on charges of smuggling foreign currency (after setting up a ghost company Steve Young, smuggling it out of the country).

See also 
 Furgate

References 

1939 births
Living people
Korea Football Association
Entrepreneurship by country
Sungkyunkwan University alumni
Kyunggi High School alumni